Golchehreh is a 2011 Iranian drama film directed by Vahid Mousaian. Golchehreh is based on a true story about the Taliban in Afghanistan and how they tried to destroy their National Film Archive and closing the cinemas.

Cast
 Masoud Rayegan as Ashraf Khan
 Ladan Mostofi as Rokhsareh
 Afshin Hashemi as Salar
 Hedayat Hashemi as Goudarz
 Hossein Moheb Ahari

References

External links
 
 Official website

2011 films
2011 drama films
Iranian drama films
2010s Persian-language films